The Sutherlin Bank Building is a bank building in Sutherlin, Oregon, in the United States. It was built in 1910 and was added to the National Register of Historic Places on August 1, 1984.

See also
 National Register of Historic Places listings in Douglas County, Oregon

References

1910 establishments in Oregon
Bank buildings on the National Register of Historic Places in Oregon
Commercial buildings completed in 1910
National Register of Historic Places in Douglas County, Oregon